Justin David Pugh (born August 15, 1990) is an American football guard for the Arizona Cardinals of the National Football League (NFL). He played college football at Syracuse. He was drafted by the New York Giants in the first round of the 2013 NFL Draft.

High school career
Pugh attended Council Rock High School South in Holland, Pennsylvania. He was named to the 2008 Pennsylvania Football News All-State Second-team for defense. He earned all-area and All-Suburban One League First-team honors as a junior and senior and named second-team all-area as a defensive lineman as a senior. He was named 2008 team MVP and defensive player of the year as a team captain. As a sophomore, he earned second-team all-area honors as an offensive tackle.

College career
Pugh attended Syracuse University, where he played for the Syracuse Orange football team from 2009 to 2012. He started 34 games in his career, and earned All-Big East Conference honors in three consecutive seasons; second-team as a sophomore, and first-team as a junior and senior. Pugh entered the 2013 NFL Draft with a year of college football eligibility remaining. Since he had already graduated, Pugh was cleared by the National Football League to compete in the 2013 Senior Bowl.

Professional career

New York Giants
The New York Giants selected Pugh in the first round (19th overall) of the 2013 NFL Draft. He was the fifth offensive tackle and seventh offensive linemen selected in 2013. Pugh also became the highest player selected from Syracuse since Dwight Freeney in (first round, 11th overall) 2002 and the highest offensive linemen selected from Syracuse since Bob Fleck in 1954.

2013
On July 25, 2013, the New York Giants signed Pugh to a four-year, $8.34 million contract that includes $7.96 million guaranteed and a signing bonus of $4.44 million.

Throughout training camp, Pugh competed with incumbent starter David Diehl for the starting right tackle position. Head coach Tom Coughlin named Pugh the starting right tackle to begin his rookie season.

He made his first career start and professional regular season debut in the New York Giants' season-opening 36-31 loss at the Dallas Cowboys. Pugh started the first half of the season poorly, but made significant improvement in the second half of the season. Pugh received an overall grade of -4.9 for the first half of the season, +12.0 for the last eight games, and received an overall grade of -1.6 for the entire season. They also gave him a 93.4 in Pass Blocking Efficiency and +2.5 for run blocking. Out of 644 pass block snaps in 16 starts, Pugh allowed 43 hurries, gave up five sacks, and three hits.

2014
Pugh entered the 2014 season slated as the incumbent starting right tackle after the retirement of David Diehl. He started 14 games at right tackle and missed Weeks 12-13 after suffering a quad injury that plagued him for a part of the season. This was his first season under new offensive coordinator Ben McAdoo after the departure of Kevin Gilbride.

2015

Pugh entered training camp as the starting left guard after the New York Giants signed free agent Marshall Newhouse and named him the starting right tackle. The Giants originally drafted Pugh with the intention to have him play offensive guard, but decided to keep him at right tackle. They also stated that Pugh was better suited for guard under Ben McAdoo's offense. Pugh started 14 games throughout the season and missed two games (Weeks 10/ and 12) due to a concussion. He received high grades, played well throughout the season, and was ranked fifth among all offensive guards in performance grades (+12.5) through the first eight games. By the end of the season he was ranked the ninth best offensive guard by Pro Football Focus with an overall grade of 86.7.

2016
On April 26, 2016, the New York Giants chose to pick up the fifth-year, $8.82 million option on Pugh's rookie contract.

After a stellar season in 2015, Pugh was slated as the starting left guard entering training camp and was officially named the starter at the beginning of the season. Through the first nine games, he was ranked as the top offensive left guard in the league by Pro Football Focus with an overall grade of 87.8. On November 9, 2016, he started at left guard during a 28-23 victory over the Philadelphia Eagles, but left after suffering an injury to his leg. It was later discovered to be a sprained MCL and he missed the next five games (Weeks 10-14).

2017
In 2017, Pugh started the first eight games before going down with a back injury. He missed the next five games before being placed on injured reserve on December 14, 2017.

Arizona Cardinals
On March 17, 2018, Pugh signed a five-year, $45 million contract with the Arizona Cardinals. He started seven games at right guard before suffering a knee injury in Week 10. He was placed on injured reserve on November 13, 2018.

In 2019, Pugh started all 16 games, 14 at left guard and two at right tackle.

In Week 6 of the 2022 season, Pugh suffered a torn ACL and was placed on injured reserve on October 20, 2022, ending his season.

References

External links
Syracuse Orange bio
Arizona Cardinals bio

1990 births
Living people
Sportspeople from Bucks County, Pennsylvania
Players of American football from Pennsylvania
American football offensive tackles
Syracuse Orange football players
New York Giants players
Arizona Cardinals players